Kappa Omicron Nu is a college honor society, based in the United States, for students in human sciences. Kappa Omicron Nu chapters are located at colleges and universities that offer a strong human sciences program. Its mission is to promote empowered leaders through excellence in scholarship, leadership, and research in the human sciences. There is also a strong focus on service, and contribution to the local community.

As with most college honor societies, most members join as current college students, who are invited after displaying excellence in scholarship. After joining, members remain members for life. Members join local chapters, which communicate with a national office.

KON is a non-profit organization, and is accredited by the Association of College Honor Societies (ACHS).

History 
Kappa Omicron Nu was established on February 21, 1990, through consolidation of Omicron Nu and Kappa Omicron Phi. Both groups had been members of the Association of College Honor Societies (ACHS). The notion of consolidation came from a strategic planning session for the Administrative leadership of the two organizations. Phi Upsilon Omicron was also invited to join in the discussion of forming one Honor Society, but demurred. Consolidation was eased by an initial period of three years where the two groups were managed by a single administrative office.

Other suggested names for the consolidated groups were Omicron Society and Sigma Rho Lambda.

By the time of the merger, the two groups shared the same publication: Home Economics FORUM, now the ΚΟΝ Forum.

Omicron Nu, Kappa Omicron Phi, and Phi Upsilon Omicron were all honor societies for specialization in home economics. When Omicron Nu and Kappa Omicron Phi consolidated into Kappa Omicron Nu they too began with a focus on home economics. As the home economics profession evolved, in 1994 the American Association of Family and Consumer Sciences (AAFCS) changed the name of the profession from "home economics" to "family and consumer sciences" to better reflect the changing needs in the United States and the current scope of topics related to this field. After this change Kappa Omicron Nu changed its specialization from "home economics" to "human sciences."

Omicron Nu
Omicron Nu was founded at Michigan Agricultural College (now Michigan State University) on  April 23, 1912.

The founders were six faculty members and eleven student members.

Faculty: Agnes Hunt (Cade), Lillian Peppard, Louise Freyhofer, Grace Stevens, Hazel Berg (Layer), Maude Gilchrist
Students: Vera Coffeen, Verna Allen, Fernell Allen, Alida Dearborn, Josephine Hart, Bessie G. Howe, Lillian M. Mullenbach, Helen Louise Norton, Lutie E. Robinson, Helen M. Sheldon, and Philena E. Smith.

At the time of the discussion of the merger in 1989, Omicron Nu had 65,000 members, 50 active chapters, five Alumni Chapters and a National Alumni Chapter.

Omicron Nu was a founding member of the Professional Panhellenic Association, a predecessor to the PFA. Omicron Nu joined the Association of College Honor Societies (ACHS) in 1951 and was readmitted in 1968.

Kappa Omicron Phi
Kappa Omicron Phi was founded at Northwest Missouri State College (now Northwest Missouri State University) on December 11, 1922. The name, Kappa Omicron Phi, was suggested by Mabel Cook, a student in the dietetics class of Hettie Margaret Anthony. Miss Anthony, who was the head of the school's Home Economics department, was a leader in Kappa Omicron Phi for the first 14 years of its existence.

At the time of the discussion of the merger in 1989, Omicron Nu had 26,000 members, 79 active chapters, eight Alumni Chapters and an Alumni Chapter-Large.

Eligibility 
Undergraduate members are required to:
Have declared a major in one of the human sciences
Have completed 45 semester hours or equivalent
Rank in the top 25% of their class in the unit
Graduate members are required to:

 Have declared a major in one of the human sciences
 Have completed 12 semester hours or equivalent
 Have a minimum GPA of 3.5 on a 4.0 scale.

Some professionals are offered membership, usually because of active volunteerism or involvement with the organization, however the vast majority of members join as college students.

Membership is available to professionals and majors in any of the following or related specialty areas, including: consumer resource management, design, exercise science, family and consumer sciences education, financial planning, food science and human nutrition, health sciences, human environment and housing, individual and family development, institution/hotel/restaurant management, interior design, kinesiology, leadership, marital and family therapy, merchandising management, textiles/apparel and clothing.

Chapter listing
Designation of Chapters
 A chapter, which was formed by the predecessor society Kappa Omicron Phi, shall have the prefix "Kappa" before its Greek-letter chapter name. A chapter, which was formed by the predecessor society Omicron Nu, shall have the prefix "Omicron" before its Greek-letter name. The first collegiate chapter chartered by Kappa Omicron Nu shall be designated Nu Alpha, and the remainder of the chapters shall follow according to the Greek alphabet with the prefix "Nu."

Chartered as Kappa Omicron Phi
Kappa Alpha - Northwest Missouri State University
Kappa Iota - Texas A&M University-Kingsville
Kappa Pi - University of New Mexico
Kappa Chi - Immaculata University
Kappa Alpha Alpha - Marywood University
Kappa Alpha Gamma - Seton Hill University
Kappa Alpha Theta - Eastern Illinois University
Kappa Alpha Tau - Bradley University
Kappa Alpha Phi - Sam Houston State University
Kappa Beta Alpha - Samford University
Kappa Beta Beta - University of North Alabama
Kappa Beta Epsilon - Prairie View A&M University
Kappa Beta Eta - Virginia State University
Kappa Beta Theta - Lamar University
Kappa Beta Kappa - Western Illinois University
Kappa Beta Mu - Tennessee Technological University
Kappa Beta Xi - Carson-Newman University
Kappa Beta Sigma - Tennessee State University
Kappa Beta Phi - Mississippi State University
Kappa Gamma Alpha - Alcorn State University
Kappa Gamma Delta - Delta State University
Kappa Gamma Epsilon - North Carolina Central University
Kappa Gamma Eta - University of Mississippi
Kappa Gamma Theta - Baylor University
Kappa Gamma Rho - Alabama A & M University
Kappa Gamma Sigma - South Carolina State University
Kappa Gamma Upsilon - Appalachian State University
Kappa Gamma Phi - Northwestern State University of LA
Kappa Delta Gamma - University of Akron
Kappa Delta Zeta - St. Catherine University
Kappa Delta Mu - North Carolina A & T University
Kappa Delta Xi - Morgan State University
Kappa Delta Omicron - Meredith College
Kappa Delta Pi - Nicholls State University
Kappa Delta Rho - Olivet Nazarene University
Kappa Delta Upsilon - University of Maryland-Eastern Shore
Kappa Delta Psi - University of Arkansas-Pine Bluff

Chartered as Omicron Nu
Omicron Gamma - Iowa State University
Omicron Kappa - Washington State University
Omicron Mu - Cornell University
Omicron Pi - Florida State University
Omicron Tau - Penn State University
Omicron Theta - Kansas State University
Omicron Alpha Beta - University of Maine
Omicron Alpha Gamma - University of Montevallo
Omicron Alpha Delta - University of Utah
Omicron Alpha Iota - Syracuse University
Omicron Alpha Kappa - University of North Carolina-Greensboro
Omicron Alpha Nu - Auburn University
Omicron Alpha Rho - New York University
Omicron Alpha Rho-Hunter - Hunter College
Omicron Alpha Upsilon - University of Delaware
Omicron Alpha Psi - CSU-Long Beach
Omicron Alpha Omega - University of Missouri
Omicron Beta Alpha - Rutgers University
Omicron Beta Beta - Louisiana Tech University
Omicron Beta Gamma - Northern Illinois University
Omicron Beta Epsilon - CSU-Northridge
Omicron Beta Theta - Montclair State University

Chartered as Kappa Omicron Nu
National Alumni - Any
National Chapter - Any
Nu Alpha - Berea College
Nu Delta - Harding University
Nu Zeta - Seattle Pacific University
Nu Kappa - Penn State University-Altoona
Nu Mu - Washington State University Vancouver
Nu Nu - Southern Utah University
Nu Omicron - California University of Pennsylvania
Nu Pi - CSU-Fullerton
Nu Upsilon - CSU-San Marcos
Nu Phi - University of New Haven
Nu Chi - University of the Incarnate Word
Nu Omega - Life University
Nu Alpha Gamma - Georgia Gwinnett College
Nu Alpha Delta - CSU-Sacramento
Nu Alpha Epsilon - Georgian Court University
Nu Alpha Zeta - Elon University
Nu Alpha Eta - Stevenson University
Nu Alpha Theta - New Mexico State University
Nu Alpha Iota - Missouri Baptist University
Nu Alpha Kappa - Molloy College
Nu Alpha Lambda - Blue Mountain College

References

External links 
 
  ACHS Kappa Omicron Nu entry
  Kappa Omicron Nu chapter list at ACHS

 

Association of College Honor Societies
Honor societies
Student organizations established in 1990
1990 establishments in Michigan